The Lincoln Institute was an all-black boarding high school in Shelby County, Kentucky from 1912 to 1966.

The school was created by the trustees of Berea College after the Day Law passed the Kentucky Legislature in 1904.  It put an end to the racially integrated education at Berea that had lasted since the end of the Civil War.  The founders of the school chose the name Lincoln when they realized that there was no educational institution in the state of Kentucky named after the president.

The founders originally intended Lincoln to be a college as well as a high school, but by the 1930s it gave up its junior college function. Lincoln offered both vocational education and standard high school classes.  The students produced the school's food on the campus' .

The rise of integrated education as a result of the Civil Rights Movement reduced the need for general high schools like Lincoln, and in 1966, the Lincoln Institute closed.  The campus was used for the Lincoln School for the Gifted, a school for gifted but disadvantaged children, from 1966 to 1970 which was led by former science teacher Samuel Robinson. Since 1972, the old Lincoln campus has been used as the Whitney M. Young Jr. Job Corps Center, a U.S. Department of Labor Job Corps Center. The Center opened in 1972 and is named for Whitney M. Young Jr., a civil rights leader and Lincoln Institute alumnus. The center provides academic and career training to students on a residential and non-residential basis. The center is administered as part of the Job Corps programs Philadelphia region.

Whitney M. Young Jr. was a prominent leader of the Civil Rights Movement and director of the National Urban League from 1961 to 1971. He was born on the campus of the Lincoln Institute in 1921 when his father, Whitney Young Sr., was president of the institute and was later an alumnus.  
 
The campus also houses the Whitney Young Birthplace and Museum, a National Historic Landmark that presents the story of the Lincoln Institute and Whitney Young Jr. Just adjacent to the entrance to the campus a historical marker and memorial commemorates the massacre of 22 members of the 5th U.S. Colored Cavalry (USCC) by Confederate guerrillas during the American Civil War.

Today, the Lincoln Foundation, which was established along with the school, carries on the work of the Lincoln Institute by providing educational programs for disadvantaged youths in the Louisville area and preserving the Lincoln Institute's historic legacy.

See also 
 5th and 6th U.S. Colored Cavalry (USCC Mae Street Kidd

References

External links
Lincoln Institute Alumni Website
Lincoln Foundation Homepage

Defunct schools in Kentucky
National Register of Historic Places in Shelby County, Kentucky
University and college buildings on the National Register of Historic Places in Kentucky
School buildings on the National Register of Historic Places in Kentucky
Education in Shelby County, Kentucky
Historically segregated African-American schools in Kentucky
Historic districts on the National Register of Historic Places in Kentucky
Job Corps
Boarding schools in Kentucky
Defunct universities and colleges in Kentucky
Tudor Revival architecture in Kentucky
Berea College